The 2016–17 Districts One Day Tournament was a List A cricket competition that took place in Sri Lanka. It replaced the scheduled Premier Limited Overs Tournament, after a legal challenge from Negombo Cricket Club, after they were removed from Tier B of the 2016–17 Premier League Tournament. The challenge stopped the Premier Limited Overs Tournament from taking place, but Sri Lanka Cricket (SLC) organised this tournament to replace it.

The tournament started on 15 March 2017, with 24 teams split into eight groups of three, with the matches given List A status. The final was played between Kegalle District and Colombo District at the P Sara Oval, Colombo, with Colombo District winning by 72 runs.

Group stage
The following fixtures took place in the group stage of the tournament. For some fixtures, the complete scorecards are unknown, but local sources state that the matches did take place.

Central Group

Eastern Group

Northern Group

North Central Group

North Western Group

Southern Group

Uva Group

Western Group

Quarter finals

Semi finals

Final

References

External links
 Series home at ESPN Cricinfo

Districts One Day Tournament
Districts One Day Tournament